Bahar Ab (also Romanized as Bahār Āb) is a village in Seyyed Ebrahim Rural District, Zarrinabad District, Dehloran County, Ilam Province, Iran. At the 2006 census, its population was 17, in 4 families. The village is populated by Kurds.

References 

Populated places in Dehloran County
Kurdish settlements in Ilam Province